The Akaniaceae or turnipwood family are a family of flowering plants in the order Brassicales. It comprises two genera of trees, Akania and Bretschneidera, each with a single species. These plants are native to China, Vietnam, Taiwan, and eastern Australia.

Species
Akania bidwillii (turnipwood) - northeastern Australia
Bretschneidera sinensis - southern China, Taiwan, Thailand and Vietnam

References

 
Brassicales families